Untouched is a 1954 Mexican film written by Luis Alcoriza.

External links
 

1954 films
1950s Spanish-language films
Films set in jungles
Mexican black-and-white films
Mexican adventure films
1954 adventure films
1950s Mexican films